The Cainites or Cainians (Kainoi, and , Kaianoi) were a Gnostic and antinomian sect known to venerate Cain as the first victim of the Demiurge, the deity of the Old Testament, who was identified by many groups of Gnostics as evil. The sect was relatively small. They were mentioned by Tertullian and Irenaeus as existing in the eastern Roman Empire during the 2nd century. One of their purported religious texts was the Gospel of Judas.

History
The oldest source is to be found in Irenaeus, Against Heresies. i. 31.

Cain and Abel

Ireneaus states that the Cainites regarded Cain as derived from the highest God, not the Creator God worshipped by Jews and other Christians. According to Irenaeus, they claimed fellowship with Esau, Korah, the men of Sodom, and all such people, and regarded themselves as persecuted by the Creator. But they escaped injury from him, because they were protected by the goddess Sophia.

Epiphanius of Salamis (Haer. 38), who appears to have some source of information independent of Irenaeus, gives a much longer account. He describes Abel as being derived from the weaker principle.

Redemption

Like other Gnostics, the Cainites distinguished between the Creator and the Supreme God. They identified the Creator with the God of the Jews, viewing him and those he favored with hostility and believing that the purpose of redemption  was the dissolution of his work. They claimed kinship with those to whom he showed antagonism in the Old Testament but believed he was the weaker power and could do them no permanent harm, since they enjoyed the protection of Sophia.

They may have shared with other heretical Christians a belief in the division of humanity into two classes: the spiritual and the material. Material people belonged to the realm of the Creator and derived their being from him but were doomed to destruction. Spiritual people were imprisoned in bodies of flesh but derived their essential being from the highest Power. They were opposed by the Creator and his minions but were destined to triumph over them as Cain did over Abel.

Judas

They regarded Judas the traitor as having full cognizance of the truth. He therefore, rather than the other disciples, was able to accomplish the mystery of the betrayal, and so bring about the dissolution of all things both celestial and terrestrial. The Cainites possessed a work entitled The Gospel of Judas, and Irenaeus says that he had himself collected writings of theirs, where they advocated that the work of Hystera should be dissolved. By Hystera they meant the Maker of Heaven and Earth.

There is no doubt that they applauded the action of Judas in the betrayal, but authorities differ as to the motive which prompted him. The view that Judas through his more perfect Gnosis penetrated the wish of Jesus more successfully than the others, and accomplished it by bringing him to the Cross through which he effected redemption, is only one of them.

Epiphanius also says that Judas forced the Archons, or rulers, against their will to slay Christ, and thus assisted us to the salvation of the Cross. Philaster, on the other hand, assigns the action of Judas to his knowledge that Christ intended to destroy the truth—a purpose which he frustrated by the betrayal.

Transmigration

So far as the moral character and conduct of the Cainites is concerned, there is no doubt that Irenaeus intended to represent them as shrinking from no vileness, but rather as deliberately practising it. He states that they taught, as did Carpocrates, that salvation could be attained only by passing through all experience. Whenever any sin or vile action was performed by them, they asserted that an angel was present whom they invoked, claiming that they were fulfilling his operation. Perfect knowledge consisted in going without a tremor into such actions as it is not lawful even to name.

Carpocrates, we are told, defended this practice by a theory of transmigration. It was necessary to pass through all experiences, and hence the soul had to pass from body to body till the whole range of experience had been traversed. If, however, this could all be crowded into a single lifetime, then the transmigration became unnecessary. Arthur S. Peake sees no ground to suppose that the Cainites held such a view, but they seem, in his opinion, to have professed the belief that this fullness of experience was essential to salvation. We have no substantial justification for asserting or doubting the truth of Irenaeus' account, though accusations of immorality urged against heretics should always be received with caution. G.R.S. Mead (Fragments of a Faith Forgotten, 1900, p. 229) thinks that originally they were ascetics, while N. Lardner (History of Heretics, bk. ii. ch. xiv. [= Works, 1829, viii. 560]) questions whether a sect guilty of such enormities ever existed. Arthur S. Peake, on the other hand, believes that there is no valid reason to deny the generally accepted view that the Gnostic attitude to matter did lead to quite opposite results. According to him, some Gnostics would infer from that attitude a duty to crush the flesh beneath the spirit by the severest austerity, but the premise might lead to a libertine as well as to an ascetic conclusion.

Source texts on the Cainites
 Irenaeus, Against Heresies  1.31.1–2
 Epiphanius of Salamis, Panarion  38
 Hippolytus, Against Heresies 8
 Pseudo-Tertullian, Against All Heresies 7
 Tertullian, On Baptism  1.

In popular culture
The book Demian, by Hermann Hesse, extensively draws upon the beliefs of the Cainite sect.  The eponymous character Max Demian even convinces the protagonist Emil Sinclair that Christianity had misunderstood Cain's virtue over Abel's.
The sect is mentioned by Lucifer in The Sandman #22 when talking to Cain in Hell, noting "no greater percentage of them turned up here than of any other religion".
The sect is included as a dualist heresy in the computer game Crusader Kings 3.
The Cainites are featured as antagonists in the Spanish HBO series 30 Coins.
Although not appearing as a religious sect, Vampires in the Vampire the Masquerade universe refer to themselves as Cainites, meaning descendants of Cain.

See also
Sethians

Notes

Bibliography
"Cainites" from the Catholic Encyclopedia
"Cainities," Hastings' Dictionary of the New Testament

Attribution

Gnosticism
Early Gnostic sects